Clover Park is a baseball stadium located in Port St. Lucie, Florida.  The stadium was built in time for the 1988 season and holds 7,160 people.  It is the spring training home of the New York Mets (who moved from St. Petersburg's Al Lang Stadium), as well as the home to the St. Lucie Mets Single-A team and the Florida Complex League Mets Rookie League team. The stadium shares the same field dimensions of the now demolished Shea Stadium. It also sometimes hosts college games.

Naming rights
The stadium was originally named Thomas J. White Stadium. White was a real estate developer from St. Louis, Missouri, who worked with sportswriter Jack Champion on the successful campaign to bring the Mets to Port St. Lucie. This name would continue to be used from 1988 until 2004 when the Mets changed the name of the venue to Tradition Field.

On March 23, 2010, during a Mets spring training game against the Atlanta Braves, it was announced that effective immediately the stadium would be renamed Digital Domain Park as a result of a multi-year partnership between the Mets and Digital Domain.

At the end of the 2012 season, the Mets announced that Digital Domain would no longer own the naming rights to the ballpark and that the stadium would temporarily be renamed Mets Stadium. On February 7, 2013, the Mets struck a new deal with the developers of the nearby master-planned neighborhood Tradition and the ballpark was once again called Tradition Field.

On February 23, 2017, the Mets announced a 10-year strategic partnership with First Data to rename the ballpark First Data Field. First Data's 2019 acquisition by Fiserv led in February 2020 to the ballpark being renamed Clover Park for the company's Clover point-of-sale-platform.

Improvements
The Stadium featured several new amenities in 2012. The right field bleacher was replaced with 500 field-level seats, highlighted by an outdoor bar and grill similar to the third base-side Tiki Bar. The right field section was also connected to the outfield grass berm area for easy access throughout the facility. The scoreboard was upgraded to include a larger screen featuring replay highlights in HD.

The stadium was renovated for the 2020 Spring Training season. The improvements included new concessions, clubhouses, and additional outfield areas for spectators. In 2022, the bullpens were moved from on the field to behind the left field fence.

Florida State League All-Star Games
Since opening, Clover Park has hosted the Florida State League All-Star Game a total of three times. The most recent time was in 2015, following the 1994 and 2004 editions of the exhibition game.

References

External links

 New York Mets – Spring Training Ballpark
 Digital Domain Park Views – Ball Parks of the Minor Leagues

Minor league baseball venues
Grapefruit League venues
Port St. Lucie, Florida
New York Mets spring training venues
1988 establishments in Florida
Sports venues completed in 1988
Florida Complex League ballparks
Florida State League ballparks
Sports venues in St. Lucie County, Florida